Andrew RomaSanta, better known as Andy Romano, (April 16, 1936 – September 14, 2022) was an American actor, known for playing "J.D.", an outlaw motorcyclist and right-hand henchman of the character Eric von Zipper (played by Harvey Lembeck) in the 1960s Beach Party movies (which starred Annette Funicello and Frankie Avalon).

When the Beach Party saga ended, Romano went through much of the 1970s and 1980s appearing in minor roles in television episodes and some TV movies. In the late 1980s, he returned to film in supporting roles. He retired from acting in the late 1990s and settled in Washington state.

Romano died on September 14, 2022, at the age of 86.

Selected filmography

References

External links

1941 births
2022 deaths
20th-century American male actors
21st-century American male actors
American male film actors
American male television actors
American people of Italian descent